Arthur John "Butch" Weis (March 2, 1901 – May 4, 1997) was a Major League Baseball left fielder who played for four seasons. He played for the Chicago Cubs from 1922 to 1925.

External links

1901 births
1997 deaths
Chicago Cubs players
Major League Baseball left fielders
Baseball players from Missouri
Rock Island Islanders players
Shreveport Gassers players
Springfield Midgets players
Wichita Falls Spudders players
St. Paul Saints (AA) players
Los Angeles Angels (minor league) players
Little Rock Travelers players
Mission Reds players
Birmingham Barons players
Louisville Colonels (minor league) players
Atlanta Crackers players
Knoxville Smokies players
Fort Worth Cats players
Toledo Mud Hens players